Nueva era is the 1997 fourth album by Amistades Peligrosas which went platinum in Spain. Three singles were released: "Nada que perder", "Quítame este velo", and "Más circo y más pan".

Track listing

 (*) - instrumental

References

External links

1997 albums